Lepturges multilineatus is a species of beetle in the family Cerambycidae. It was described by Melzer in 1928.

References

Lepturges
Beetles described in 1928